Pattani Province Stadium or Pattani Municipality Stadium or Rainbow Stadium is a multi-purpose stadium in Pattani Province , Thailand.  It is currently used mostly for football matches and is the home stadium of Pattani FC.  The stadium holds 8,000 people.

Multi-purpose stadiums in Thailand
Buildings and structures in Pattani province
Sport in Pattani province